Angiolo Maria Gasparo Vestris (19 November 1730, Florence - 10 June 1809, Paris) was a Franco-Italian ballet dancer.

The younger brother of Gaétan Vestris and Thérèse Vestris, he studied dance with Louis Dupré and became a soloist of the Opéra de Paris in 1753.  He then danced at Stuttgart under the direction of Noverre (also marrying Rose Gourgaud, daughter of the comic-actor Dugazon, in the town in 1766) before returning to Paris in 1767, where he was taken on as an actor at the Comédie-Italienne.

1730 births
1809 deaths
French male stage actors
Italian emigrants to France
French male ballet dancers
Italian male ballet dancers
Italian male stage actors
People from Florence
18th-century French male actors
18th-century Italian male actors
18th-century Italian ballet dancers
18th-century French ballet dancers
Vestris family